N28 may refer to:
 N28 (Long Island bus)
 Beechcraft N28 Kalkara, an American target drone used by Australia
 London Buses route N28
 N28 road (Ireland) 
 Nieuport 28, a French First World War fighter aircraft
 Route nationale 28, in France
 Sun-rising (hieroglyph)